Shotgun Jones is a 1914 American short silent Western film directed by Colin Campbell.

Cast
 Wheeler Oakman 
 Jack McDonald
 Frank Clark (as Frank M. Clark)
 Hoot Gibson
 Bessie Eyton
 Fernando Gálvez
 William Elmer
 Joseph W. Girard

See also
 Hoot Gibson filmography

References

External links
 

1914 films
1914 Western (genre) films
1914 short films
American silent short films
American black-and-white films
Films directed by Colin Campbell
Selig Polyscope Company films
Silent American Western (genre) films
1910s American films
1910s English-language films